Michalis Romanidis (alternate spelling: Michail) (born June 19, 1966, Thessaloniki, Greece) is a retired Greek professional basketball player. At 1.99 m (6 ft 6  in.) tall, he played at the small forward and power forward positions.

Professional career
While a member of the Greek club Aris, Romanidis won 8 Greek League championships (1983, 1985, 1986, 1987, 1988, 1989, 1990, 1991) and 6 Greek Cup titles (1985, 1987, 1988, 1989, 1990, 1992). He also played at 3 EuroLeague Final Fours (1988, 1989, 1990) with Aris.

He also played with Pagrati.

National team career
Romanidis was also a member of the senior men's Greek national team. He played with Greece at the 1983 EuroBasket, the 1984 FIBA European Olympic Qualifying Tournament, and the 1986 FIBA World Championship. He was also a member of Greece's team that won the gold medal at 1987 EuroBasket. He played in 82 games with Greece, averaging 4.4 points per game.

Post-playing career
After he ended his pro playing career, Romanidis worked as basketball executive. He worked in the management of the Greek clubs Milon, Alimos, Dafni, and Rethymno.

Awards and accomplishments

Pro career
8× Greek League Champion: (1983, 1985, 1986, 1987, 1988, 1989, 1990, 1991)
6× Greek Cup Winner: (1985, 1987, 1988, 1989, 1990, 1992)

Greek senior national team
1987 EuroBasket:

References

External links 
FIBA EuroLeague Profile
FIBA Profile

1966 births
Living people
1986 FIBA World Championship players
Aris B.C. players
FIBA EuroBasket-winning players
Greek Basket League players
Greek basketball executives and administrators
Greek men's basketball players
Pagrati B.C. players
Papagou B.C. players
Place of birth missing (living people)
Power forwards (basketball)
Small forwards
Basketball players from Thessaloniki